Nicolaas Jacobus Oosthuizen (born 19 November 1996 in George, South Africa) is a South African rugby union player for the Enisei-STM in the Rugby Premier League. He can play as a loosehead or a tighthead prop.

Rugby career

2012–14: Schoolboy rugby

Oosthuizen attended Hoër Landbouskool Marlow in Cradock, from where he got selected to represent the Eastern Province Rugby Union at various youth tournaments. In 2012, he played for Eastern Province at the Under-16 Grant Khomo Week tournament held in Johannesburg. He then represented the Eastern Province Country Districts on two occasions in South Africa's premier high school rugby union tournament, the Under-18 Craven Week.

2015–: Eastern Province, Varsity Cup and South Africa Under-20

After school, Oosthuizen joined the  academy and he was included in their Under-19 squad for their 2015 Under-19 Provincial Championship Group A season. He started the season at loosehead prop, playing there in their first four matches and scoring one try in their 41–24 win over the s. He then shifted to tighthead prop for the remainder of the competition, making a further eight starts and playing off the bench in one match. His side had a great start to the season, winning their first ten matches in a row, eventually topping the log with eleven wins in their twelve matches, to qualify for the semi-finals. Oosthuizen started their semi-final match against the s and scored his second try of the season in a 31–15 victory over the team from Bloemfontein. He also started the final and helped his team beat the s 25–23 in Johannesburg to win the competition for the first time in their history.

A disappointing season saw the Madibaz finish in second-last position on the log.

In March 2016, Oosthuizen was included in a South Africa Under-20 training squad, and made the cut to be named in a reduced provisional squad a week later. He missed out on selection for their opening match in Pool C of the tournament as South Africa came from behind to beat Japan 59–19, but came on as a replacement in each of their remaining pool matches, a 13–19 defeat to Argentina and a 40-31 bonus-point victory over France in their final match to secure a semi-final place as the best runner-up in the competition. He made his first start in the semi-final, as South Africa faced three-time champions England. However, the hosts proving too strong for South Africa, knocking them out of the competition with a 39–17 victory. He was again named on the bench against Argentina in the third-place play-off final, but failed to come on as Argentina beat South Africa – as they did in the pool stages – convincingly winning 49–19 and in the process condemning South Africa to fourth place in the competition.

References

South African rugby union players
Living people
1996 births
People from George, South Africa
Rugby union props
Eastern Province Elephants players
South Africa Under-20 international rugby union players
Southern Kings players
Griquas (rugby union) players
Yenisey-STM Krasnoyarsk players
Rugby union players from the Western Cape